The London England Temple (formerly the London Temple) is the 12th operating temple of the Church of Jesus Christ of Latter-day Saints (LDS Church) and is located in Newchapel, Surrey, England. Despite its name, it is not located within London or Greater London.

The temple serves church members in south Wales, the Channel Islands, southern parts of England, the Limerick District of Ireland, and Jordan.

History 
The site of the original 34,000 square foot building, located 25 miles south of London, was selected in 1952 by David O. McKay and Stayner Richards. Building of the temple began on 27 August 1955, and the temple was dedicated on 7 September 1958. Over 76,000 people toured the building during the public open house before it was dedicated. It was the first LDS temple to be built in the United Kingdom. Its construction was part of a growth in the number of temples, led by David O. McKay, who performed the dedication.

After thirty-two years, the temple was closed for remodeling and refurbishing. An additional  were added, as well as a fourth floor. In October 1992, Gordon B. Hinckley rededicated the London England Temple, after a two-week public open house. A second British temple was built in 1998 in Chorley, Lancashire.

A statue of the angel Moroni was placed atop the temple at the conclusion of the Jubilee Celebration. Included in the Jubilee project was the restoring the Manor House and the visitors center, adding new mission offices to the temple site and renovating the accommodation center for temple patrons.

In 2020, like all the church's other temples, the London England Temple was closed in response to the coronavirus pandemic.

Description 
It is faced with white Portland limestone with a green copper spire. Like other LDS Church temples, a temple recommend is required for church members to enter. Surrounding the temple is a 40-room mansion, named the Manor House, 10 acres of formal grounds, and a large pond.

See also 

 Comparison of temples of The Church of Jesus Christ of Latter-day Saints
 List of temples of The Church of Jesus Christ of Latter-day Saints
 List of temples of The Church of Jesus Christ of Latter-day Saints by geographic region
 List of places of worship in Tandridge (district)
 Temple architecture (Latter-day Saints)
 The Church of Jesus Christ of Latter-day Saints in England

References

Gallery

External links 

 London England Temple Official site
 London England Temple at ChurchofJesusChristTemples.org

Buildings and structures in Surrey
Religious buildings and structures completed in 1958
Temples in England
The Church of Jesus Christ of Latter-day Saints in England
The Church of Jesus Christ of Latter-day Saints in the United Kingdom
Religious buildings and structures in Surrey